Earl of Cromer is a title in the Peerage of the United Kingdom, held by members of the Baring family, of German descent. It was created for Evelyn Baring, 1st Viscount Cromer, long time British Consul-General in Egypt. He had already been created Baron Cromer, of Cromer in the County of Norfolk, in 1892, Viscount Cromer, of Cromer in the County of Norfolk, in 1899, and was made Viscount Errington, of Hexham in the County of Northumberland, and Earl of Cromer, in the County of Norfolk, on 8 August 1901. These titles are also in the Peerage of the United Kingdom. A member of the influential Baring banking family, Lord Cromer was the son of Henry Baring, third son of Sir Francis Baring, 1st Baronet. He was succeeded by his son, the second Earl, a diplomat and civil servant. His son, the third Earl, was also a diplomat and served as British Ambassador to the United States between 1971 and 1974. In 2010 the titles are held by the latter's son, the fourth Earl, who succeeded in 1991.

Evelyn Baring, 1st Baron Howick of Glendale, was the third son of the first Earl.

Cromer refers to Cromer in the county of Norfolk.

The family seat is Drayton Court, near Drayton, Somerset.

Earls of Cromer (1901)

Evelyn Baring, 1st Earl of Cromer (1841–1917)
Rowland Thomas Baring, 2nd Earl of Cromer (1877–1953)
George Rowland Stanley Baring, 3rd Earl of Cromer (1918–1991)
Evelyn Rowland Esmond Baring, 4th Earl of Cromer (b. 1946)

The heir apparent is the present holder's son Alexander Rowland Harmsworth Baring, Viscount Errington (b. 1994)

Family tree

See also
Baron Northbrook
Baron Revelstoke
Baron Ashburton
Baron Howick of Glendale

References

External links

Earldoms in the Peerage of the United Kingdom
Noble titles created in 1901
Earl
Cromer